Killowat is a fictional character from the DC Comics series Teen Titans.

Publication history
Killowat first appeared in Team Titans #1 and was created by Dan Jurgens.

Fictional character biography
Killowat's story began 10 years in the future; or, rather, the false future where Lord Chaos reigned and a force known as the Team Titans struggled to overthrow his tyranny. Lord Chaos sought to destroy the rebels known as the Team Titans. 

Charlie Watkins was an ambitious young man that yearned to join Lord Chaos' Force Elite.  Believing Chaos a god, Charlie could think of no greater honor. He was accepted and after much training, he attained the rank of corporal. As he served the Force Elite, he became increasingly aware of Lord Chaos' true nature. Now disgusted at the master he served, he approached the Team Titans and offered to become a double agent. On a routine mission, things went awry. Charlie was exposed as a spy, and he fell into one of the energy converters. Instead of killing him, it transformed him into a being of electricity. He could now alter his body from normal human, Charlie Watkins, to an electrical avenger, Killowat. During that same mission, Team Titan Silver Shield died in battle. Now exposed as a traitor to Lord Chaos, Killowat offered to become a member of the Team Titans (in Silver Shield's honor) and was accepted. Shortly thereafter, the Team Titans leader gave the team a mission: travel 10 years into the past to stop Chaos from ever being born. To accomplish this, the Teamers were assigned to kill Donna Troy before she would give birth to the child who would become Lord Chaos. The team successfully traveled to the past and came into conflict with the New Titans. Donna gave birth to her son before the team could intervene. However, the Titans and the Team Titans were able to stop Chaos and spare Donna's life at the same time. After this, Killowat along with his colleagues found themselves stranded in the past, unable to return to their future. They bonded with the current Titans via a trip to Hollywood and a possible cartoon deal.

Later, with nowhere else to go, they resided at Donna Troy's New Jersey farmhouse. The Teamers tried to find a place in this new world. At one time, the Teamers searched for their counterparts in this timeline. Killowat found the counterparts to the aunt and uncle that raised him – but discovered they were African-American; it seemed unlikely he existed in this timeline at all. Charlie had an especially hard time adjusting to his new life. Complicating matters, he was very much in love with Mirage, who had no romantic feelings for him. Shortly after this, the Team Titans' lives were disrupted by the time crisis known as Zero Hour. It was then revealed that the Team Titans leader in the future was the villainous Monarch - who created a false future world so he could train metahumans (The Team Titans) to act as sleeper agent assassins. He knew of the impending time crisis, and wanted a super-powered army at his command. The time-villain Extant commanded all the Team Titans to attack the heroes who were trying to unravel this time crisis. His plan was thwarted; the heroes contained the Team Titans. Time continued to collapse, erasing the false timelines that had emerged. As a result, all the Team Titans were erased from existence. Strangely enough, three people remained unscathed from Monarch's false timeline: Tara Markov (Terra II), Miriam Delgado (Mirage) and Deathwing (who was believed to be a future Dick Grayson). The Time Trapper revealed that Mirage, Deathwing and Terra were from this timeline, not an alternate timeline, as they had thought. All three had been implanted with false memories by the Time Trapper and turned into "sleeper agents" who would fight the villainous Monarch in the coming Zero Hour event.

The rest of the Team Titans, including Killowat, ceased to exist altogether. It is unknown whether some version of Killowat has or will exist in this timeline.

Other versions

Elseworlds
 In an Elseworlds story, Killowat is the heroic protector of a refugee camp full of aliens.

In other media
 Killowat appears in the Teen Titans two-part finale "Calling All Titans" and "Titans Together". This version is an honorary member of the Teen Titans.
 The Teen Titans animated series incarnation of Killowat appears in Teen Titans Go! issue #48. He hails from an alternate universe where he was a member of Team Titans. On the verge of death, he called for help from another universe, which Raven answered by pulling him into her universe. He subsequently joins the Teen Titans until she is eventually able to return him to his home universe.

References

Comics characters introduced in 1992
DC Comics superheroes
DC Comics metahumans
Fictional secret agents and spies
Characters created by Dan Jurgens
Fictional characters with electric or magnetic abilities